The Demolition Squad is a 1968 Yugoslav drama film directed by Hajrudin Krvavac.

Cast 
 Rade Marković - The Doctor
 Bata Živojinović - Korčagin 
 Jovan Janićijević - Gavran 
 Ljubiša Samardžić - Šarac
 Husein Čokić - Pavle
 Zdravko Biogradlija - Žarko
 Rastislav Jović - Ivan
 Zaim Muzaferija - Nusret
 Anka Zupanc - Olga 
 Janez Vrhovec - Partisan Doctor
 Petar Dobric - Partisan Commander
 Maks Furijan - Oberleutnant
 Rejhan Demirdzic - Leutnant
 Rudi Alvadj - Rottenführer
 Mario Arkus - Train Engineer

References

External links 

1968 drama films
1968 films
Films directed by Hajrudin Krvavac
Yugoslav drama films
War films set in Partisan Yugoslavia
Films about Yugoslav Resistance
Serbo-Croatian-language films